The following highways are numbered 67:

Australia
 Fitzroy Developmental Road - Queensland State Route 67

Canada
 Alberta Highway 67 (former)
 Manitoba Highway 67
 Highway 67 (Ontario)

Finland
 Finnish national road 67

India
 National Highway 67 (India)

Korea, South
 National Route 67
Gukjido 67

New Zealand
 New Zealand State Highway 67
 New Zealand State Highway 67A

Philippines
 N67 highway (Philippines)

United Kingdom
 British A67
 British M67

United States
 Interstate 67 (proposed)
 U.S. Route 67
 Alabama State Route 67
 Arizona State Route 67
 California State Route 67
 Colorado State Highway 67
 Connecticut Route 67
 Florida State Road 67 (former)
 County Road 67 (Franklin County, Florida)
 County Road 67A (Franklin County, Florida)
 County Road 67 (Liberty County, Florida)
 County Road 67A (Liberty County, Florida)
 Georgia State Route 67
 Idaho State Highway 67
 Illinois Route 67 (former)
 Indiana State Road 67
 K-67 (Kansas highway)
 Kentucky Route 67
 Louisiana Highway 67
 Louisiana State Route 67 (former)
 Maryland Route 67
Maryland Route 67A
Maryland Route 67B
Maryland Route 67C
Maryland Route 67D
Maryland Route 67E
Maryland Route 67F
 Massachusetts Route 67
 M-67 (Michigan highway)
 Minnesota State Highway 67
 Mississippi Highway 67
Missouri Route 67 (1922) (former)
 Nebraska Highway 67
 Nebraska Link 67E
 Nebraska Spur 67A
 Nebraska Spur 67B
 Nebraska Spur 67C
 Nebraska Recreation Road 67D
 New Jersey Route 67
 County Route 67 (Bergen County, New Jersey)
 New York State Route 67
 County Route 67 (Cattaraugus County, New York)
 County Route 67 (Cayuga County, New York)
 County Route 67 (Chautauqua County, New York)
 County Route 67 (Delaware County, New York)
 County Route 67 (Dutchess County, New York)
 County Route 67A (Dutchess County, New York)
 County Route 67 (Erie County, New York)
 County Route 67 (Greene County, New York)
 County Route 67A (Greene County, New York)
 County Route 67 (Niagara County, New York)
 County Route 67 (Oneida County, New York)
 County Route 67A (Oneida County, New York)
 County Route 67 (Onondaga County, New York)
 County Route 67 (Orange County, New York)
 County Route 67 (Putnam County, New York)
 County Route 67 (Rensselaer County, New York)
 County Route 67 (Rockland County, New York)
 County Route 67 (Steuben County, New York)
 County Route 67 (Suffolk County, New York)
 County Route 67A (Suffolk County, New York)
 County Route 67 (Washington County, New York)
 North Carolina Highway 67
 North Dakota Highway 67
 Ohio State Route 67
 Oklahoma State Highway 67
 Pennsylvania Route 67 (former)
 South Carolina Highway 67
 Tennessee State Route 67
 Texas State Highway 67
 Texas State Highway Loop 67 (former)
 Texas State Highway Spur 67
 Farm to Market Road 67
 Texas Park Road 67
 Utah State Route 67
 Vermont Route 67
 Vermont Route 67A
 Virginia State Route 67
 West Virginia Route 67
 Wisconsin Highway 67

See also
A67 (disambiguation)